Number 15 Squadron, sometimes written as No. XV Squadron, was a squadron of the Royal Air Force. It most recently operated the Panavia Tornado GR4 from RAF Lossiemouth as No. XV (Reserve) Squadron. It was the RAF's Operational Conversion Unit for the Tornado GR4 which taught pilots and Weapon Systems Officers (WSO) how to fly the aircraft and what tactics to use to best exploit the performance of their aircraft and its weapons.

History

World War I
No. 15 Squadron was first formed at Farnborough Airfield on 1 March 1915 as a Royal Flying Corps training unit, commanded by Major Philip Joubert de la Ferté. It was mainly equipped with Royal Aircraft Factory B.E.2cs, supplemented with a few Bristol Scouts, and moved to France on 22 December 1915, undertaking a reconnaissance role in support of the Army.  It operated in support of IV Corps during the Battle of the Somme in summer 1916, suffering heavy losses from both ground fire and German fighter aircraft.  It was praised by Douglas Haig  for its work in support of the Fifth Army in the Ancre salient in January 1917.

It was again heavily committed to action in support of the offensive at Arras in spring 1917. It re-equipped with the Royal Aircraft Factory R.E.8 in June 1917, retaining the "Harry Tate" (a rhyming-slang term for the aircraft) until the end of the First World War. The squadron was based at La Gorgue in northern France from 7 July until 18 August 2017.

For the great tank attack at the Battle of Cambrai (November–December 2017), No.15 Squadron was specially tasked with checking the camouflaging of the troops, guns and dumps assembled before the attack.

The squadron moved back to the United Kingdom in February 1919, and was disbanded at Fowlmere on 31 December that year.

One of the officers who began his career in the squadron during this era was future Air Marshal Sir Charles Steele.

Interwar 1919–1939
It reformed on 20 March 1924 at Martlesham Heath as part of the Aeroplane and Armament Experimental Establishment, mainly carrying out test flying of bomber aircraft. No. 15 was again reformed in 1934 at RAF Abingdon as a light bomber squadron equipped with the Hawker Hart. Its Commanding Officer of the day, Squadron Leader T W Elmhirst, DFC, instigated the squadron's tradition of writing its squadron number in Roman numerals. It received Hawker Hinds as a temporary replacement for the Harts before re-equipping with Fairey Battle monoplanes in 1938.

World War II

Still equipped with Fairey Battle light bombers, the squadron flew to France in September 1939 as part of No. 71 Wing, Advanced Air Striking Force. It departed from RAF Abingdon circa 2 September. After returning to the UK, the following year it re-equipped first with Bristol Blenheims and again with Vickers Wellingtons before becoming one of the first Short Stirling bomber squadrons. One famous Stirling was donated by Lady MacRobert in memory of her three sons killed in RAF service and named MacRobert's Reply.

In 1943, the squadron converted to Avro Lancasters and was based at RAF Mildenhall. In mid-1945 the squadron was involved in Operation mana dropping food to Dutch civilians and later in repatriation flights for returning allied POWs.

Cold War service
In 1947, the Lancasters were replaced with Avro Lincolns, before the squadron adopted the nuclear strike role with Boeing Washingtons in 1951.

No. XV Squadron re-equipped with the English Electric Canberra B.2 bomber in June 1953, whilst at RAF Coningsby, Lincolnshire, later moving to RAF Cottesmore, Rutland and then to RAF Honington, Suffolk. The Canberra was used in combat in the Suez Crisis and dropped the most bombs in the eighteen days of conflict. The Squadron disbanded on 15 April 1957.

On 1 September 1958, it was reformed as the second Handley Page Victor squadron, stationed at RAF Cottesmore. In 1962, it was one of the many squadrons ready for action during the Cuban Missile Crisis. Deploying to RAF Tengah in 1963, it was on hand as a show of force to deter Indonesia during the Indonesia-Malaysia Confrontation. Following this, it was disbanded on 31 October 1964 upon withdrawal from overseas detachment. It was then intended to be reformed with the BAC TSR-2 and then the General Dynamics F-111K, but with both acquisitions cancelled, these plans were not carried out.

Service as a nuclear force

In 1970, the Squadron was finally reformed with the Blackburn Buccaneer S.2B at RAF Honington, shortly afterwards moving to RAF Laarbruch in Germany. From 1971 their task at RAF Laarbruch, assigned to SACEUR, was the support of the army in a European land battle, first in a conventional role, and later in a tactical nuclear delivery role, if required. RAF planning staff expected  the squadron's twelve Buccaneer S2B aircraft to suffer attrition of one third their strength, leaving sufficient survivors, with those held back in reserve from the conventional phase, to deliver the squadron's allocation of eighteen WE.177 nuclear bombs.

In 1983, the squadron exchanged their twelve Buccaneer S2s for the same number of Tornado GR.1s, for use in a similar role from early 1984. Because of the UK's commitment to SACEUR, this involved the use of the "Designate" process whereby a Tornado squadron was formed and worked up at Honington and once operational moved to Laarbruch and assumed the No.15 Squadron identity from the Buccaneer unit. This made the squadron the first Tornado unit in Germany - a force that would grow to eight squadrons - and remained in the nuclear delivery role for SACEUR with an increased allocation of 18 weapons owing to the Tornado's ability to carry two bombs. The squadron's nuclear delivery role assigned to SACEUR continued at this strength until 1991, when it disbanded.

Desert Storm onwards

Deployed to Bahrain during the build-up to Operation Desert Storm, the Squadron was given the specific brief to knock out Iraqi Air Force bases by bombing the runways. On its second mission, an ultra-low-level daylight mission against Ar Rumaylah airfield with Squadron Leader Pablo Mason leading a flight of four Tornados, his number two crew of John Peters and navigator John Nichol were shot down and became POWs. Mason (along with many other RAF tornado crews) flew a total of 24 bombing missions in  Desert Storm, from ultra-low-level daylight, medium-level night bombing and, on 2 February 1991, the first-ever Buccaneer/Tornado attack using laser-guided bombs. During the conflict (14 February), another aircraft crewed by XV Squadron personnel was shot down, resulting in the loss of Flt Lt Stephen Hicks and the capture of Flt Lt Rupert Clark.

In 1992 No.45 (Reserve) Squadron, the Tornado Weapons Conversion Unit based at RAF Honington changed its "shadow" identity to No.15 (Reserve) Squadron, remaining at RAF Honington until 1993 assigned to SACEUR in the role it had performed when based at RAF Laarbruch. The squadron's equipment of twenty-six aircraft and thirty-nine WE.177 nuclear bombs was unusually large. Relocation to RAF Lossiemouth in 1994 brought reassignment to SACLANT in the maritime strike role, armed with a variety of conventional weapons and eighteen WE.177 nuclear bombs. After the closure of the Cottesmore-based Tri-National Tornado Training Establishment (TTTE) in 1999, 15(R) Squadron assumed responsibility for both conversion to the Tornado and weapons training.

The squadron disbanded on 31 March 2017 in preparation for the retirement of the Tornado GR4 in 2019. The squadron aircraft and crews will be absorbed into front-line squadrons at RAF Marham who will carry out refresher training when required. The squadron completed its final operational flying on 17 March 2017.

Aircraft operated
List of aircraft operated by No. 15 Squadron.
 Royal Aircraft Factory B.E.2c (1915–1917)
 Bristol Scout (1916)
 Royal Aircraft Factory B.E.2d/e (1916–1917)
 Royal Aircraft Factory R.E.8 (1917–1919)
 Airco DH.9A (1924–1926)
 Hawker Horsley (1926–1934)
 Various types for testing (1924–1934)
 Hawker Hart (1934–1936)
 Hawker Hind (1936–1938)
 Fairey Battle (June 1938 – December 1939)
 Bristol Blenheim Mk IV (December 1939 – November 1940)
 Vickers Wellington Mk IC (November 1940 – May 1941)
 Short Stirling Mk I/ Mk III (April 1941 – December 1943)
 Avro Lancaster B.I/B.I(Special)/B.III (December 1943 – 1947)
 Avro Lincoln (1947–1950)
 Boeing Washington B.1 (1951–1953)
 English Electric Canberra B.2 (1953–1957)
 Handley Page Victor B.1 (1958–1964)
 Blackburn Buccaneer S.2B (1970–1983)
 Panavia Tornado GR1 (1983–2002)
 Panavia Tornado GR4 (2001–2017)

See also 
List of Royal Air Force aircraft squadrons
"Pablo" Mason – Sqn Ldr during the Gulf War
Phil Lamason

References

Notes

Bibliography

 Ford-Jones, Martyn R. and Valerie A. Ford-Jones. Oxford's Own: The Men and Machines of No.15/XV Squadron Royal Flying Corps/Royal Air Force. Atglen, Pennsylvania: Schiffer Publishing, . .
 Rawlings, J.D.R. "History of No. 15 Squadron". Air Pictorial, March 1971. Vol 33 No 3. pp. 98–100.
 Dudley Ward, Maj C.H., The Fifty Sixth Division, 1st London Territorial Division, 1914–1918, London: John Murray, 1921/Uckfield: Naval & Military Press, 2001, .

External links

No. 15 Squadron
Air of Authority – Sqn Histories (11, 12, 13, 14, 15 sqns)
No. 15 Squadron history
About RAF Lossiemouth

Military units and formations established in 1915
015 Squadron
015 Squadron
Military units and formations of the Gulf War
1915 establishments in the United Kingdom